is a train station in Ube, Yamaguchi Prefecture, Japan.

Lines
West Japan Railway Company
Ube Line

History 
Kiwa station opened in 1924.

The station building was renovated in 2020.

References 

Railway stations in Japan opened in 1924
Railway stations in Yamaguchi Prefecture